The Hundred Flowers Award for Best Chinese Opera Film was first awarded by the China Film Association in 1962.

1980s

1960s

References

Chinese Opera Film